The 1981 Tolly Cobbold Classic was the third edition of the professional invitational snooker tournament, which took place between 24th and 25 February 1981 at the Corn Exchange in Ipswich, England.

Graham Miles won the tournament beating Cliff Thorburn 5–1 in the final.

Group phase

All matches in the group phase were played over four frames.

  Graham Miles 4–0 Alex Higgins 
  Graham Miles 4–0 Kirk Stevens 
  Kirk Stevens 3–1 Alex Higgins 
  Cliff Thorburn 2–2 Graham Miles 
  Cliff Thorburn 4–0 Kirk Stevens 
  Cliff Thorburn 4–2 Alex Higgins

Final

Third-place play-off

References

Tolly Cobbold Classic
Tolly Cobbold Classic
Tolly Cobbold Classic
Tolly Cobbold Classic